The Pau Congress was the fifth national congress of the French Socialist Party (Parti socialiste or PS). It took place from 31 January to 12 February 1975. The "Epinay Coalition" between Mitterrand and Chevènement's CÉRÉS group ended and CÉRÉS joined the minority.

Results

François Mitterrand was re-elected as First Secretary.

References

Congresses of the Socialist Party (France)
1975 in France
1975 in politics
1975 conferences